The Electoral district of Sydney Hamlets was an electorate of the New South Wales Legislative Council at a time when some of its members were elected and the balance were appointed by the Governor. It was a new electorate created in 1851 by the expansion of the Legislative Council to 54 members, with 18 to be appointed and 36 elected.
The electoral district included what were then outer suburbs of Sydney and are now the inner suburbs of Glebe, Camperdown, O'Connell Town (north Newtown), Chippendale, Redfern,  Surry Hills, Paddington, St Leonards and Balmain.

In 1856 the unicameral Legislative Council was abolished and replaced with an elected Legislative Assembly and an appointed Legislative Council. The district was represented by the Legislative Assembly electorate of Sydney Hamlets.

Thomas Smart won the first election, declared on 22 September 1851.

Members

Election results

1851

1855
Thomas Smart resigned in February 1855 to travel to England.

See also
Members of the New South Wales Legislative Council, 1851-1856

References

Former electoral districts of New South Wales Legislative Council
1851 establishments in Australia
1856 disestablishments in Australia